José Manuel Bruno Faria (born 13 July 1985) is a Portuguese sport shooter who won a medal at individual senior level at the European Championships.

References

External links
 

1985 births
Living people
Trap and double trap shooters
Portuguese male sport shooters